Ischnosoma is a genus of beetles belonging to the family Staphylinidae.

The species of this genus are found in Eurasia, America, Australia.

Species:
 Ischnosoma abdenago Kocian, 2003
 Ischnosoma abessinum (Bernhauer, 1915)

References

Staphylinidae
Staphylinidae genera